Albanian Screen  is a defunct television station with satellite frequency from Tirana, Albania. It broadcast in Europe via EUTELSAT Satellite by covering the whole territory of Europe. Albanian Screen Television broadcasts terrestrially in all the territory of Albania, and via digital terrestrial signal in the city of Tirana. The General Director of Albanian Screen Television was oil mogul Mr. Rezart Taçi.

History
Founded in 2003 by businessman and head of VEVE Group Vehbi Veliu, AS was the first privately owned satellite channel in Albania. After becoming a property of Taçi Oil International Group in 2011 it was rebranded to Albanian Screen. Its program line up has undergone a fundamental change, by passing from an informative structure into a generalist television, which is totally oriented toward information, education and entertainment.

Alba TV
The UHF channel of ASTV on the Tirana dial was originally occupied by Alba TV which was launched in 1996 by Italian businessmen. The local channel established successfully itself mainly in the Tirana area until around 2003 when it was bought by VEVE Group.

References

External links
Albanian Screen Official Website
Rezart Taci Companies

Defunct television networks in Albania
Television channels and stations established in 2011
Mass media in Tirana